USS Finch (AM-9) was a  acquired by the U.S. Navy for the dangerous task of removing mines from minefields laid in the water to prevent ships from passing. Finch was named for the finch, and is strictly speaking the only U.S. vessel named for such.

Finch was launched 30 March 1918 by Standard Shipbuilding Co., New York; sponsored by Mrs. F. G. Peabody; and commissioned 10 September 1918.

North Atlantic operations  
After training and operations with a submarine bell, Finch sailed from New York 9 August 1919 for Kirkwall, Orkney Islands, Scotland. Here she based for two months of duty removing the vast number of mines laid in the North Sea during World War I. Finch returned to Charleston on 29 November 1920, and on 3 January 1920 sailed for San Pedro, California, where from 1 March to 29 August she was in reduced commission.

Pacific Ocean operations 
Modernized, she sailed from San Francisco on 20 August 1921 for duty with the Asiatic Fleet, and for the next 20 years, served in the Philippines in the winter and out of the China base at Chefoo in the summer. Her duties were varied, and included towing and salvage work, as well as participation in the Yangtze River Patrol. She joined in fleet exercises, and as war tension heightened, played a part in protecting American citizens and interests in the Far East.

In 1937, Finch was commanded briefly by LCDR (later VADM, permanent rank) Hyman G. Rickover, future commander of Naval Reactors and the longest-serving active duty U.S. Naval officer.    Rickover commanded Finch from 17 July to 5 October 1937 and it was the only command at sea Rickover ever held. The ship was primarily operating at Shanghai, China, to protect American interests during the Battle of Shanghai.

World War II operations  
In 1941, she began work in intensive development exercises with submarine and mine groups in the Philippines, and as war came closer, spent December on patrol in the Taiwan Straits. During the return leg of this mission, the vessels were temporarily surrounded by Japanese naval vessels headed toward the Philippines. The gunboats scouted the Japanese column, then pulled ahead to report the naval activity to Washington, while the Finch and Heron stayed behind, eventually being left by the Japanese as well. The two vessels returned to Manila Bay on 6 December 1941.

As the Japanese began aerial bombardment of bases in the Philippines, the Finch continued her task of sweeping for mines to keep the channel into the harbor open for incoming shipping.  Yeoman Pratt reported that machine gunners on board the Finch downed one Japanese aircraft during an air raid, and though the Captain congratulated them, he asked them not to repeat the feat so that they would not become a special target and be able to continue mine sweeping operations.  After running out of fuel in March, Finch was anchored in shallow water and her crew taken to shore defense positions.

Sunk by a Japanese bomb 
On 9 April 1942, while moored at the eastern point of Corregidor, Finch was damaged by the near miss of a Japanese bomb, her seams opening and fragments of the bomb piercing her hull. The entire crew landed safely, and Finch was abandoned to sink the next day, 10 April 1942.

Many of the Finchs crew served during the siege of Corregidor, though her captain was evacuated to Australia via submarine.  The survivors of Corregidor were the first prisoners to arrive at Cabanatuan prison camp.  Many were later removed to camps in Japan or Taiwan.  Yeoman Pratt, held in three camps in Taiwan, was evacuated aboard the destroyer escort USS Finch, and was startled at seeing the name, thinking it had been named for his old vessel, but that ship was named in honor of Lt.(j.g.) Joseph W. Finch, who died aboard the USS Laffey during the battle of Guadalcanal.

According to Japanese records the Finch was salvaged and designated IJN Patrol Boat 103 in April 1943.  The PB 103 served as a convoy escort in the Philippines and Indochina. On 12 January 1945, off Cape Padaran in the South China Sea (11°10'N, 108°55'E), Finch was attacked and sunk by aircraft from the USS Lexington (CV-16), USS Hancock (CV-19) and USS Hornet (CV-12) which were part of Vice Admiral John S. McCain, Sr.'s Task Force 38 that had entered the South China Sea to raid Japanese shipping.

Awards

World War II Victory Medal with "Minesweeper" clasp
Yangtze Service Medal
China Service Medal
American Defense Service Medal with "FLEET" clasp
Asiatic-Pacific Campaign Medal with one battle star
World War Two Victory Medal
Philippine Presidential Unit Citation
Philippine Defense Medal with one star

Notes

References

External links
 

Lapwing-class minesweepers
Ships built in New York City
World War II mine warfare vessels of the United States
Shipwrecks in the Philippine Sea
1918 ships
Naval ships of the United States captured by Japan during World War II
World War II patrol vessels of Japan
Maritime incidents in April 1942
Maritime incidents in January 1945
Ships sunk by Japanese aircraft
Minesweepers sunk by aircraft